The Gusevogorskoye mine is a large iron mine located in central-western Russia in the Sverdlovsk Oblast. Gusevogorskoye represents one of the largest iron ore reserves in Russia and in the world having estimated reserves of 2 billion tonnes of ore grading 15.8% iron metal.

See also 
 List of mines in Russia

References 

Iron mines in Russia